La Bolduc is a Canadian drama film, directed by François Bouvier and released in 2018. A biopic of Quebec folk singer La Bolduc, the film stars Debbie Lynch-White in the title role.

The film also stars Émile Proulx-Cloutier as Bolduc's husband Édouard, Bianca Gervais as her friend Juliette Newton and Mylène Mackay as activist and politician Thérèse Casgrain, as well as Yan England, Serge Postigo, Germain Houde, Jean Beaudry and Paul Doucet.

The film premiered at the Festival du film de l'Outaouais on March 23, 2018, before going into general release across Quebec on April 6. It topped the provincial box office in its opening weekend, and finished 2018 as the year's second highest grossing Canadian film.

References

External links
 

2018 films
2018 biographical drama films
Films directed by François Bouvier
Canadian biographical drama films
2018 drama films
French-language Canadian films
2010s Canadian films